Kristofer Marinus Schipper (23 October 1934 – 18 February 2021), also known as Rik Schipper and by his Chinese name Shi Zhouren, was a Dutch sinologist. He was a professor of Oriental studies at Leiden University, appointed there in 1993. Schipper worked as researcher for École française d'Extrême-Orient and later taught as directeur de recherche in History of Daoism studies at the École pratique des hautes études in Paris. He was head of the Institut des Hautes Études Chinoises from the Collège de France. He also taught at Fuzhou University and Zhangzhou College. After his retirement he and his wife Yuan Bingling moved to Fuzhou (Fujian) in China.

Early life and education 
Schipper was born in Järnskog, Eda Municipality on 23 October 1934. Schipper grew up near Edam, Netherlands.

His father, Klaas Abe Schipper, was a Mennonite pastor, and his mother Johanna Schipper was a devout believer. The couple was declared “Righteous Among the Nations” by Israel’s Yad Vashem Holocaust remembrance center, for their efforts in hiding Jewish people during the German occupation of Holland in World War II.

Research 
Schipper studied in Taiwan. He was very interested in the ceremonies and rituals that are part of Taoism. Knowledge of the rituals may only be passed on within a family. He was adopted by a befriended family, so he could be trained in Taoism. In 1968 he was initiated as a priest in the Zhengyi School of Taoism. He organized and edited the first complete scientific study of the 1500 works contained in the Taoist Canon of the Ming Dynasty.

Schipper became a member of the Royal Netherlands Academy of Arts and Sciences in 1995.

Library of the Western Belvedere 
In 2001 Kristofer Schipper and his wife Dr. Yuan Bingling founded the first library in China specialised in western art, literature, and culture, in Fuzhou. It is called the "Library of the Western Belvedere" or "Xiguan cangshulou 西观藏书楼" (Fuzhou University Global Civilization Research Center and Library of the Western Belvedere.)

With his library they intend to make western literature more accessible to Chinese scientists. The collection consists, in 2007, of about 25000 titles on literature, art history, and philosophy in many languages, such as English, French, German, Dutch, and other western languages.

Bibliography 
 The Taoist Canon, ed. Kristofer Schipper and Franciscus Verellen, The University of Chicago Press 2005, .
 The Taoist Body. Berkeley: University of California Press, 1993.
Schipper, Kristofer, Tao. De levende religie van China, Amsterdam (Meulenhoff) 1988,  (5e druk 2006).
Translation by Schipper of his Le corps taoïste. Corps physique, corps social, Parijs (Fayard) 1982.
 Zhuangzi, De innerlijke geschriften, transl. from the Chinese by Kristofer Schipper, Amsterdam (Meulenhoff) 1997, 
 Zhuang Zi, De volledige geschriften. Het grote klassieke boek van het taoïsme, transl. from the Chinese and annotated by Kristofer Schipper, Amsterdam (Uitgeverij Augustus) 2007, 439 pg.

References

External links 
 .
 Founding information on library.
 Schipper in the Library of the Western Belvedere.
 Reference to three interviews (in Dutch).
 Schipper received permanent residency in China in 2005.
 K. Schipper audio archives of Ritual Music in Taiwan
  Retrieved April 5, 2021.

1934 births
2021 deaths
Dutch sinologists 
Dutch Taoists
Academic staff of Fuzhou University
Academic staff of Leiden University
University of Paris alumni
Members of the Royal Netherlands Academy of Arts and Sciences
Chevaliers of the Légion d'honneur
People from Eda Municipality 
People from Edam-Volendam 
Dutch expatriates in China